Fritz Lüdi is a Swiss bobsledder who competed in the mid-1970s. He won three medals in the two-man event at the FIBT World Championships with a silver (1977) and two bronzes (1974, 1975).

Lüdi also competed at the 1964 and the 1976 Winter Olympics in Innsbruck, finishing 9th in the four-man event and 10th in the two-man event.

References
1976 bobsleigh two-man results
1976 bobsleigh four-man results
Bobsleigh two-man world championship medalists since 1931

Bobsledders at the 1964 Winter Olympics
Bobsledders at the 1976 Winter Olympics
Living people
Swiss male bobsledders
Year of birth missing (living people)
Olympic bobsledders of Switzerland